Erik Lefebvre (born July 16, 1986) is a Canadian soccer player who last played for Charlotte Eagles in the USL Second Division.

Career

College and amateur
Lefebvre attended Béatrice-Desloges High School and played amateur soccer in Canada for the Cumberland Cobras and the Ottawa Royals as a teenager, leading the Royals to the Ontario Cup Championship in 2004.

He played college soccer at Houghton College, where he was an All-AMC North Division first team member and freshman of the year in 2005, as well as NAIA All-American second team and All-AMC North Division first team member in 2006.

During his collegiate years Lefebvre also played two seasons for Ottawa Fury in the Premier Development League.

Professional
Following his graduation, and after spending time training with Canadian professional side Ottawa Wizards and Troyes AC in France, Lefebvre joined Charlotte Eagles of the USL Second Division in 2009 as backup to first choice goalkeeper Kevin Trapp. He made his debut in Charlotte's last game of the 2009 regular season on August 15, 2009, playing 90 minutes in a 3-0 victory over the Western Mass Pioneers.

Lefebvre took over as Interim Director of Goalkeeping for Charlotte Soccer Academy in 2011.
This year Erik Lefebvre will return for his third season as the Goalkeeper Coach

References

External links
Charlotte Eagles profile
Ottawa Fury profile

1986 births
Living people
Canadian soccer players
USL Second Division players
Canadian expatriate sportspeople in the United States
Charlotte Eagles players
Ottawa Fury (2005–2013) players
Soccer players from Ottawa
Expatriate soccer players in the United States
USL League Two players
Houghton University alumni
Association football goalkeepers